Robert Anthony Miller (born April 5, 1999) is an American professional baseball pitcher in the Los Angeles Dodgers organization. He played college baseball for the Louisville Cardinals. He was selected 29th overall by the Dodgers in the 2020 Major League Baseball draft.

Amateur career
Miller attended McHenry West High School in McHenry, Illinois, where he played baseball. In 2016, his junior season, he went 5–2 with a 1.98 ERA and 76 strikeouts over 55 innings. After his senior year in 2017, he was selected by the Baltimore Orioles in the 38th round of the 2017 Major League Baseball draft, but did not sign and instead enrolled at the University of Louisville where he played college baseball.

As a freshman at Louisville in 2018, Miller went 6–1 with a 2.97 ERA over 17 games (nine starts), earning Freshman All-American honors and spots on the American Athletic Conference Third Team and All-Freshman Team. After the 2018 season, he played collegiate summer baseball with the Brewster Whitecaps of the Cape Cod Baseball League. In 2019, his sophomore year at Louisville, he pitched to a 7–1 record with a 3.83 ERA over twenty games (12 starts) and eighty innings. That summer, he spent time playing for the USA Baseball Collegiate National Team. As a junior in 2020, he went 2–0 with a 2.31 ERA over four starts, striking out 34 over  innings before the college baseball season was cut short due to the COVID-19 pandemic.

Professional career
The Los Angeles Dodgers selected Miller in the first round, with the 29th overall pick, in the 2020 Major League Baseball draft. He signed with the Dodgers for a $2.2 million signing bonus. He did not play a minor league game in 2020 due to the cancellation of the minor league season caused by the pandemic.

Miller made his professional debut as the starting pitcher on Opening Day in 2021 for the Great Lakes Loons of the High-A Central, striking out five batters over three innings while allowing only two singles and a walk. On July 24, Miller pitched five innings of a combined no-hitter against the Lake County Captains alongside Clayton Beeter, Jake Cantleberry, and Cameron Gibbens. Miller appeared in 14 games (11 starts) for the Loons, compiling a 2–2 record and 3.06 ERA while striking out 56 over 46 innings. On September 8, he was promoted to the Tulsa Drillers of the Double-A Central, and pitched  innings for them to end the season. He was selected to play in the Arizona Fall League for the Glendale Desert Dogs after the season where he was named to the Fall Stars Game. He returned to Tulsa to begin the 2022 season, where he made 19 starts and went 6-6 with a 4.45 ERA and 117 strikeouts over 91 innings and was selected to represent the Dodgers at the 2022 All-Star Futures Game. Miller was promoted to the Oklahoma City Dodgers of the Triple-A Pacific Coast League on August 15. He made four starts for Oklahoma City, with a 1–1 record and 3.38 ERA.

References

External links

Louisville Cardinals bio

1999 births
Living people
Baseball players from Illinois
People from Elk Grove Village, Illinois
Baseball pitchers
Louisville Cardinals baseball players
Brewster Whitecaps players
Great Lakes Loons players
Minor league baseball players
Tulsa Drillers players
Glendale Desert Dogs players
United States national baseball team players
Oklahoma City Dodgers players